The New Space Opera 2 is a science fiction anthology edited by Gardner Dozois and Jonathan Strahan. It was published in 2009, and includes all original stories selected to represent the genre of space opera. Five of the stories in the book were selected for the Locus recommended reading list for 2009.

This anthology follows The New Space Opera which was published in 2007.

Contents
Robert Charles Wilson: "Utriusque Cosmi"
Peter Watts: "The Island"
John Kessel: "Events Preceding the Helvetican Renaissance"
Cory Doctorow: "To Go Boldly"
John Barnes: "The Lost Princess Man"
Kristine Kathryn Rusch: "Defect"
Jay Lake: "To Raise a Mutiny Betwixt Yourselves"
Neal Asher: "Shell Game"
Garth Nix: "Punctuality"
Sean Williams: "Inevitable"
Bruce Sterling: "Join the Navy and See the Worlds"
Bill Willingham: "Fearless Space Pirates of The Outer Rings"
John Meaney: "From the Heart"
Elizabeth Moon: "Chameleons"
Tad Williams: "The Tenth Muse"
Justina Robson: Cracklegrackle"
John Scalzi: "The Tale of the Wicked"
Mike Resnick: "Catastrophe Baker and A Canticle For Leibowitz"
John C. Wright: "The Far End of History"

References

2009 non-fiction books
Gardner Dozois anthologies
Space opera novels